This is a list of members of the South Australian Legislative Council from 1950 to 1953.

 Labor MLC Oscar Oates died on 2 September 1951. Stan Bevan was elected unopposed to the vacancy on 24 October.

References
Parliament of South Australia — Statistical Record of the Legislature

Members of South Australian parliaments by term
20th-century Australian politicians